"When She Cries" is a song written by Sonny LeMaire and Marc Beeson, and recorded by American country music group Restless Heart. It was released in August 1992 as the first single from the album Big Iron Horses, the band's first album not to feature lead singer Larry Stewart. In his place, drummer John Dittrich sings lead.

The song reached number 9 on the Billboard Hot Country Singles & Tracks chart. It also reached number 11 on the US Billboard Hot 100 making it their highest peaking crossover single. Instead of a B-side, the cassette single features snippets of other songs on the album.

Music video
The music video was directed by Wayne Miller and features the band performing in a warehouse of Eagle Built Systems Inc.

Charts

Weekly charts

Year-end charts

References

1992 songs
1992 singles
Restless Heart songs
Song recordings produced by Josh Leo
Songs written by Marc Beeson
RCA Records Nashville singles
Songs written by Sonny LeMaire
1990s ballads
Country ballads
Rock ballads